Ross Callachan (born 4 September 1993) is a professional footballer who plays as a midfielder for Scottish Premiership club Ross County.

Club career

Raith Rovers 
Callachan came through the youth system at Raith Rovers. He was promoted to the first team after agreeing a full-time contract with the club as a 16-year-old in June 2010.

He spent much of the 2010–11 season in the reserves. He did, however, make his first team league debut in the final match of the campaign, replacing teammate Iain Williamson as a 60th-minute substitute in a 3–0 defeat against Partick Thistle on 7 May 2011.

His first game in the following 2011–12 season was in the second round of the Scottish League Cup. Raith Rovers recorded a convincing 4–1 victory over Montrose in this July 2011 fixture, with Callachan appearing as a second-half substitute.

In March 2012 he joined Musselburgh Athletic on loan until the end of the season.

Heart of Midlothian 
On 31 August 2017, Callachan signed for Heart of Midlothian on a two-year deal, for an undisclosed transfer fee.

St Johnstone
After one season at Hearts, Callachan signed for St Johnstone on a two-year deal before the closing of the Summer transfer window. He scored his first goal for St. Johnstone on 29 September 2018 against his former club Hearts in a 2–1 defeat at Tynecastle.

Loan to Dundee 
Callachan joined Dundee on loan in January 2020 for the rest of the season. After just a few weeks with Dundee however, Callachan suffered a leg fracture during a game against Partick Thistle that kept him out for the rest of the season. In May, St Johnstone announced Callachan would be one of a few players to leave the club once his contract ended at the end of the month.

Hamilton Academical 
On 29 June 2020, Hamilton Academical's chairman confirmed that Callachan had signed for Accies.

Ross County
Callachan signed a two-year contract with Ross County in June 2021.

Career statistics

References

External links
 Ross Callachan at Raith Rovers official website

1993 births
Living people
Raith Rovers F.C. players
Scottish footballers
Scottish Football League players
Association football midfielders
Musselburgh Athletic F.C. players
Scottish Junior Football Association players
Scottish Professional Football League players
Heart of Midlothian F.C. players
St Johnstone F.C. players
Dundee F.C. players
Hamilton Academical F.C. players
Ross County F.C. players